Coronariae (literally a crown or garland) is a term used historically to refer to a group of flowering plants, generally including the lilies (Liliaceae), and later replaced by the order Liliales. First used in the 17th century by John Ray, it referred to flowers used to insert in garlands. Coronariae soon came to be associated with Liliaceae in the Linnaean system. The term was abandoned at the end of the 19th century, being replaced with Liliiflorae and then Liliales.

History

Seventeenth to nineteenth century usage 

Coronariae was first used by John Ray in his Catalogus plantarum circa Cantabrigiam (1660) as one of 21 classes of herbaceous plants. In this grouping he included Armerius and Caryophyllus (i.e. Dianthus, Caryophyllaceae). It was next used by Linnaeus in his Philosophia Botanica (1751) to refer to a very different group of plants. Linnaeus followed Ray in describing Coronariae as "a beautiful [flower] which is inserted in crowns or garlands". His Coronariae was the ninth of his 69 ordines naturales (i.e. families), consisting of five genera, followed by Liliaceae and Muricatae. These three orders consisted of the following genera:
9. Coronariae
 Ornithogalum
 Scilla
 Hyacinthus
 Asphodelus
 Anthericum
 Polianthes

10. Liliaceae
 Lilium 
 Fritillaria
 Tulipa
 Erythronium

11. Muricatae
 Bromelia
 Renealmia
 Tillandsia
 Burmannia
 
In a later posthumous publication, Praelectiones in ordines naturales plantarum (1792), Coronariae appear as Ordo X with 28 genera, Linnaeus having merged his previous Liliaceae into Coronariae together with his eleventh order, Muricatae. In developing an ordered system of taxonomic ranks, Agardh (1825) followed Linnaeus but placed his Coronariae within the higher rank (order) of Liliiflorae and confined it to the original Liliaceae:

 XI. Liliiflorae
 43 Asparageae Br.
 44 Asphodeleae Br.
 45 Coronariae 
 46 Veratreae Salisb.
 47 Commelineae Br.
 48 Pontedereae Kunth.
 49 Dioscorinae Br.
 50 Haemodoreae Br.
 51 Irideae Juss.
 52 Narcisseae Juss.
 53 Bromeliaceae Juss.

At about the same time, Perleb (1826) followed a similar scheme with eleven families grouped into an order he called Liliaceae:
 Liliaceae
 Asparageae
 Pontederiaceae
 Asphodeleae
 Coronariae
 Colchicaceae
 Dioscoreaceae
 Hypoxideae
 Amaryllideae
 Haemodoraceae
 Burmanniaceae
 Irideae 

Endlicher (1836) used Coronariae as a class with eight subordinate orders, restoring Liliaceae as the family name: 
 Classis 15. Coronariae
 Ordo 51. Juncaceae
 Ordo 52. Philydreae
 Ordo 53. Melanthaceae
 Ordo 54. Pontederaceae
 Ordo 55. Liliaceae
 Ordo 56. Smilaceae
 Ordo 57. Dioscoreae
 Ordo 58. Taccaceae

Subsequent authors, such as Lindley (1853), preferred the term Liliales for a higher order (which Lindley called Alliances), including four families including Liliaceae. Lindley lists Coronariae as a synonym of Liliaceae: 
 Liliales
 Gilliesiaceae
 Melanthaceae
 Liliaceae
 Pontederaceae

However Bentham (1877) restored the term as one of four alliances making up the monocotyledons, with 
8 families:
 2. Coronariae
 Roxburghiaceae
 Liliaceae
 Pontederaceae
 Philydraceae
 Xyrideae
 Commelynaceae
 Junceae
 Palmae

He developed this further in his Genera plantarum (1883), this time dividing the monocotyledons into seven groups, called Series, of which in Coronariae he added Mayaceae and Rapateaceae, renamed Commelynaceae as Commelinaceae and omitted Junceae and Palmae.

Later alternative nomenclature 

Subsequent authors, now adopting a phylogenetic (phyletic) or evolutionary approach over the natural method, did not adopt Bentham's nomenclature. Eichler (1886) used Liliiflorae for the higher order including Liliaceae, as did Engler (1903) and Lotsy (1911). 

Hutchinson (1973) restored Liliales for the higher rank, an approach that has been adopted by most major classification systems onwards, reserving Liliiflorae for higher ranks. these include Cronquist (1981), Takhtajan (1997), Thorne and Reveal (2007). This is also the nomenclature of the molecular phylogenetic based modern system of the Angiosperm Phylogeny Group (APG, 1998–2016).

Modern equivalent (Liliales) 

In post-Linnaean usage, Coronariae corresponds to the modern order Liliales (Lilies and allied taxa), the largest grouping of families within the monocot grade Lilioid monocots. The number of families remains about the same as Perleb's original construction. However, the circumscription of the order Liliales (and its nominative family Liliaceae) have undergone major changes over the years, particularly with the advent of molecular phylogenetics. As a consequence, Liliales is greatly reduced, although still a relatively large monocot order. At one stage the Lilaceae, sensu Lindley, which he called lilyworts in the vernacular, consisted of 133 genera and 1200 species. In this work he unhappily acknowledged the confusing array of different approaches to the classification of the Liliaceae, the lack of a clear definition, and the great diversity in the circumscription of the order, which had expanded vastly, with many subdivisions. As he saw it, the Liliaceae had already become a catch-all grouping, being "everything that does not belong to the other parts of the Lilial Alliance", but expressed hope that the future would reveal some characteristic that would group them better. In other words, he foresaw that Liliaceae would come to be regarded as paraphyletic. 

Many of the families once considered to be part of this grouping are now considered to be in Asparagales, with the remainder in commelinids and Dioscoreales.

Liliales, sensu APG, consists of ten families:
 Alstroemeriaceae
 Campynemataceae
 Colchicaceae
 Corsiaceae
 Liliaceae
 Melanthiaceae
 Petermanniaceae
 Philesiaceae
 Ripogonaceae
 Smilacaceae

As such, it consists of about 67 genera and about 1,558 species. The bulk of the Liliales species are found in the very diverse family Liliaceae (16 genera, 610 species). Of the remaining nine families, three are referred to as the vine families (Ripogonaceae, Philesiaceae and Smilacaceae) and form a cluster. Many of these families are very small or monotypic.

Notes

References

Bibliography 

Books and symposia
 
 
 
 
 
 
 
  Excerpts.

Historical sources
 
 
 
 
 
 
 
 
 
 
 
  .

Chapters

Encyclopaedias
 
 . See also Rees's Cyclopædia.
 

Articles
 
 
 
 

Historically recognized angiosperm taxa
Liliales